The Rough Guide to Greek Café is a world music compilation album originally released in 2010. Part of the World Music Network Rough Guides series, the release covers a wide breadth of the music of Greece on Disc One, from traditional to modern. Disc Two highlights Dimitris Mistakidis. The album was compiled by Marc Dubin, a journalist specializing in Greece for the past three decades. Brad Haynes coordinated the project, Laurence Cedar mastered the work, and Phil Stanton was the producer.

Critical reception

The album received generally positive reviews upon release. Both Chris Nickon of AllMusic and Deanne Sole of PopMatters noted the use of the word "café". Nickson described the title as somewhat of a "misnomer" and the compilation instead as "an introduction to Greek music, and a very good one" showing that Greek music is "richly alive". Sole wrote that the compiler "favours forward movement", that "hardness is allowed", and that if it is indeed a "café" soundtrack, it is one "for mobs of 19th-century European aesthetes".

Track listing

Disc one

Disc two
All tracks on Disc Two are performed by Dimitris Mistakidis, a rebetika guitarist.

References

External links
 
 

2010 compilation albums
Greek Cafe
Compilation albums by Greek artists